Sylvia Lynd ( Dryhurst; 1888 – 21 February 1952) was an Anglo-Irish poet, essayist, short story writer and novelist. She was born in London but both of her parents, A.R. Dryhurst and her mother, the suffragist writer Nora Dryhurst ( Robinson) were Dubliners. Royal Academy of Dramatic Art. From 1904 to 1906, Lynd studied at the Slade School of Fine Art, later moving on to the Royal Academy of Dramatic Arts. Around this time, she was associated with the Inghinidhe na hÉireann, an Irish nationalist women’s organisation. In 1908, a monthly magazine was produced, Bean na hÉireann, which sought to discuss topics such as politics, the vote for women, language, and labour issues. Lynd edited the first issue before returning to England and Helena Molony took it over. 

In 1909, she married a journalist and man of letters, Robert Wilson Lynd, whom she had met at the London Gaelic League four years earlier. Born in Belfast to a Presbyterian minister, Robert Lynd wrote for The Northern Whig and later became a literary editor for the Daily News (later known as News Chronicle) and a columnist for New Statesman. They lived in Hampstead, London for many years and had two daughters, Máire and Sigle. Sylvia Dryhurst Lynd died in 1952, aged 63.

Works
The Chorus (1916) novel
The Thrush and the Jay (1916) Constable, essays and poems
The Goldfinches (1920) poems
The Swallowdive (1921) novel
The Mulberry Bush (1925) short stories
The Yellow Placard (1931), Gollancz, poems
The Christmas Omnibus (1932), Gollancz (editor)
The Enemies (1934), Dent, poems
English Children (1942), Britain in Pictures series, William Collins
Selected Poems of Sylvia Lynd (1945), Macmillan

Notes

External links

1888 births
1952 deaths
English women poets
20th-century English poets
20th-century English women writers
English people of Irish descent
20th-century Anglo-Irish people
Irish nationalists
Date of birth unknown